Duryodhan Majhi (14 April 1938 – 11 January 2022) was an Indian politician.

Biography
Majhi was a member of the Odisha Legislative Assembly from Khariar constituency in Nuapada district. He was five times MLA from Khariar constituency. He was first elected to Odisha Legislative Assembly in 1990 as a member of Janata Dal and again in 1995. Later he was elected as a member of Biju Janata Dal in 2000 and 2004 and as a member of Bharathiya Janata Party in 2009. He served as Minister of State for Information and Public Relations, Minister of State for Health, Family Welfare Minister of Planning and Coordination and Minister of State for Science and Technology between 2000 and 2009. He resigned from Biju Janata Dal in 2014 and fought 2014 Odisha Legislative Assembly election from the ticket of BJP. He was elected as a MLA in 2014 election. Just before the Odisha Vidhan Sabha election in 2019, he resigned from Bharatiya Janata Party and rejoined Biju Janata Dal. Majhi died in Bhubaneswar on 11 January 2022, at the age of 83.

References

1938 births
2022 deaths
21st-century Indian politicians
People from Nuapada district
Bharatiya Janata Party politicians from Odisha
Members of the Odisha Legislative Assembly
Janata Dal politicians
Biju Janata Dal politicians